The Christian Council of Lesotho is an ecumenical Christian organization in Lesotho. It was founded in 1965 and is a member of the World Council of Churches and the Fellowship of Christian Councils in Southern Africa.

External links  
Official website
World Council of Churches listing

Christian organizations established in 1965
Members of the World Council of Churches
Christian organizations based in Africa
Christianity in Lesotho
Lesotho
Religious organisations based in Lesotho